Puerto Rico Highway 120 (PR-120) is a main highway connecting Las Marías, Maricao and Sabana Grande, and is the main road through the Monte del Estado.

Major intersections

See also

 List of highways numbered 120

References

External links
 

120